Gowen is an unincorporated community and census-designated place (CDP) in Latimer County, Oklahoma, United States. Gowen has a post office with ZIP code 74545. The post office at Gowen, Indian Territory opened on January 13, 1894. The community was named for lawyer Francis I. Gowen. At the time of its founding, Gowen was located in the Moshulatubbee District of the Choctaw Nation.

The Census Bureau defined a census-designated place (CDP) for Gowen in 2015; the 2010 population within the 2015 CDP boundary is 244 and contains 118 housing units.

Demographics

References

Census-designated places in Latimer County, Oklahoma
Census-designated places in Oklahoma